Great Shelford Football Club are a football club based in Great Shelford, near Cambridge, England.

History
The club was founded in 1912, and has played at Woollards Lane since 1920. Between 1975 and 1990 the club won twelves league titles, as well as the Cambridgeshire Invitation Cup in 1980–81, 1986–87 and 1987–88. They also entered the FA Vase between 1985 and 1989, beating Eastern Counties League opposition on three occasions.

The club have won the Premier Division of the Cambridgeshire League on two occasions, in 2006–07 and 2012–13, and the Premier Division Cup in 2010–11.

Honours
Cambridgeshire League
Premier Division champions 2006–07, 2012–13
Premier Division Cup winners 1966–67, 2010–11
Cambridgeshire Invitation Cup
Winners 1980–81, 1986–87, 1987–88

References

External links
Official website

Association football clubs established in 1912
Football clubs in Cambridgeshire
1912 establishments in England
Football clubs in England
Cambridgeshire County Football League